Alexandresaurus is a genus of lizard in the family Gymnophthalmidae. The genus is monotypic, i.e., it contains only one species, Alexandresaurus camacan. The species is endemic to Brazil.

Etymology
The generic name, Alexandresaurus, is in honor of Brazilian naturalist Alexandre Rodrigues Ferreira.

The specific name, camacan, is in honor of the Camacan, an extinct indigenous people of Brazil.

Geographic range
A. camacan is found in the Brazilian state of Bahia.

Description
A. camacan is large for its family. The tail is long, averaging about twice SVL.

Reproduction
A. camacan is oviparous.

References

Further reading
Freire EMX, Jorge JS, Sales RFD, Ribeiro MM, Andrade MJM, Sousa PAG (2013). "New record and geographic distribution map of Alexandresaurus camacan Rodrigues, Pellegrino, Dixo, Verdade, Pavan, Argôlo and Sites Jr., 2007 (Squamata: Gymnophthalmidae) in northeastern Brazil". Check List 9 (4): 783–784.
Matos MA, Camardelli M, Marciano E Jr (2013). "Geographic Distribution: Alexandresaurus camacan (Alexandre's Lizard, Calanguinho do Alexandre)". Herpetological Review 44 (2): 273.
Rodrigues MT, Pellegrino KCM, Dixo M, Verdade VK, Pavan D, Argôlo AJS, Sites JW Jr (2007). "A New Genus of Microteiid Lizard from the Atlantic Forests of State of Bahia, Brazil, with a New Generic Name for Colobosaura mentalis, and a Discussion of Relationships Among the Heterodactylini (Squamata, Gymnophthalmidae)". American Museum Novitates (3565): 1–27. (Alexandresaurus, new genus, pp. 5–7; A. camacan, new species, pp. 7–15, Figures 1–4).

Gymnophthalmidae
Monotypic lizard genera
Taxa named by Miguel Trefaut Rodrigues
Taxa named by Kátia Cristina Machado Pellegrino
Taxa named by Marianna Dixo
Taxa named by Vanessa Kruth Verdade
Taxa named by Dante Pavan
Taxa named by Antônio Jorge Suzart Argôlo
Taxa named by Jack W. Sites Jr.